Couffoulens-Leuc is a railway station between Couffoulens and Leuc, Occitanie, France. The station is on the Carcassonne–Rivesaltes line. The station is served by TER (local) services operated by the SNCF.

Train services
The following services currently call at Couffoulens-Leuc:
local service (TER Occitanie) Carcassonne–Limoux

References

Railway stations in France opened in 1876
Railway stations in Aude